Candle salad is a vintage fruit salad that was popular in America from the 1920s through to the 1960s.  The salad is typically composed of lettuce, pineapple, banana, cherry, and either mayonnaise or, according to some recipes, cottage cheese.  Whipped cream may also be used.  The ingredients are assembled to resemble a lighted candle.

The candle salad is assembled by first arranging a few leaves of lettuce on a plate or decorative napkin to form the salad's base. One or more pineapple rings are stacked on top of the lettuce, providing a niche for inserting one whole (or more often half) peeled banana. For garnish, the banana can be topped with choice of cream and a cherry.

The Food Timeline history website states that "The earliest print reference we find for Candle Salad is dated 1916. It was presented in this socialite menu; no description or recipe was included:

The site lists several other references to the salad in cookbooks and newspapers throughout the 1920s.

Candle salad was known as an easy way to get children to eat fruit because of its unusual appearance. It was also considered a child-friendly introduction to cooking because of its simple construction. The recipe for candle salad was published in the 1950 edition of A Child's First Cook Book by Alma S. Lach, one of the first cookbooks written for children.  It is also in the 1957 edition of the Betty Crocker's Cook Book for Boys and Girls with the description, "It's better than a real candle because you can eat it."

A version of this salad appeared in the Mormon children's magazine [[The Friend (LDS magazine)|The Friend]] in 2008, which included a bed of alfalfa sprouts and strawberry yogurt drizzled over the top of the banana to look like dripping candle wax.

The Tested Recipes Institute of New York published it as a recipe card in 1958.

Carolyn Andrew Lynch published a small booklet called The Candle Salad Story in 2003 with several reprinted images from cookbooks and articles. It is available on Yumpu.com. She suggests that the recipe was created to help promote the banana industry.

Comedian Amy Sedaris appeared on Bravo TV's Watch What Happens: Live'' to prepare candle salad on a segment titled "Craft Time with Amy Sedaris."

Ellen DeGeneres joked about this salad on October 10, 2014. As a result, it became popular on the internet for a short time.

See also
 List of salads

References

Fruit salads
Fruit dishes